The men's singles was one of five events of the 1923 World Hard Court Championships tennis tournament held in Paris, France from 19 until 27 May 1923. The draw consisted of 70 players. Henri Cochet was the defending champion, but was knocked out in the semifinals. American Bill Johnston won the title after defeating Belgian Jean Washer in the final in 5 sets.

Draw

Finals

Top half

Section 1

Section 2

Section 3

Section 4

Bottom half

Section 5

Section 6

Section 7

Section 8

References 

Men's Singles